William W. Woessner is an American hydrogeologist and Regents Professor Emeritus of Hydrogeology at the University of Montana.
He is a recipient of Meinzer Award (2020) for his works on the "hyporheic zone, virus transport, and the occurrence/transport of pharmaceutical chemicals in groundwater."

References 

American hydrologists
University of Montana faculty
Living people
Hydrogeologists
American geologists
Year of birth missing (living people)